Amar K. Mohanty is a material scientist and biobased material engineer, academic and author. He is a Professor and Distinguished Research Chair in Sustainable Biomaterials at the Ontario Agriculture College and is the Director of the Bioproducts Discovery and Development Centre at the University of Guelph.

Mohanty has received a lot of recognition for his work in the field of bioplastics, biocomposites and advanced biorefinery. He has authored over 800 publications, has been cited over 43,000 times, and has 25 patents awarded. He is also the author of 25 book chapters, and 5 edited books, entitled Natural Fibers, Biopolymers, and Biocomposites, Packaging Nanotechnology, Handbook of Polymernanocomposites. Processing, Performance and Application: Volume A: Layered Silicates, Biocomposites: Design and Mechanical Performance, and Fiber Technology for Fiber-Reinforced Composites.

Mohanty is a Fellow of American Institute of Chemical Engineers (AIChE), Society of Plastics Engineers, Royal Society of Chemistry, and Royal Society of Canada. He is also the Editor-in-Chief of Sustainable Composites, Composites Part C -Open Access.

Early life and education
Mohanty was born in Odisha, India. He spent early life in Cuttack and Bubaneshwar, India. He studied at the Capital High School, Bhubaneswar.
Mohanty studied at Utkal University, and earned his bachelor's degree with Distinction in Chemistry in 1978, a master's degree in Polymer Chemistry in 1980, and Doctoral degree in chemistry in 1987.

Career
Following his Doctoral degree, Mohanty held appointment as a Lecturer and Senior Lecturer in 1987 at Government Colleges affiliated with Berhampur and Utkal University, India. From 1998 till 1999, he held brief appointments as Alexander von Humboldt Fellow at Berlin Institute of Technology, and as Post-Doctoral Associate at Iowa State University. Following these appointments, he joined Michigan State University as a Visiting Research Associate in 2000, and was promoted to Visiting Associate Professor in 2001, and to associate professor in 2003. He then moved to Canada, and held his next appointment at the University of Guelph as a professor in the Department of Plant Agriculture and School of Engineering.

Mohanty was Premier's Research Chair in Biomaterials & Transportation from 2008 till 2020, Research Leadership Chair from 2017 till 2020, and became OAC Distinguished Research Chair in Sustainable Biomaterials in 2020. Since 2007, he has also been serving as Director/Executive Committee Member of American Institute of Chemical Engineers at Forest Product Division.

Research
Mohanty has focused his research on engineering value-added uses of biomass wastes and industrial co-products from agro-food and biofuel industries. He has also worked extensively on circular economy, environmental sustainability, waste plastic valorization, biodegradable plastics as single-use plastic alternatives, biocarbon based composites and 3D printing of sustainable materials.

Sustainable Polymers

Circular Economy and Environmental Sustainability

Biocarbon composites 
Mohanty was the first to demonstrate that biocarbon significantly improves barrier properties when used as a filler in composite materials. He demonstrated that biocarbon acts as an oxygen scavenger to improve oxygen barrier of biodegradable polymers and blends. Furthermore, he explored the impact of poly(propylene carbonate) polyol in the context of biobased epoxy interpenetrating network.

Mohanty was among the pioneers to report the effectiveness of bicarbon as a reinforcing agent, filler, and colourant in thermoplastic composites. He explored several ways to increase the renewable content in plastic resins, developed high-quality biocarbon from a variety of non-food biomass sources, and also showed that the morphology and allotropy of renewable biocarbon can be manipulated for materials design. He was the first to use biocarbon in thermoplastic composites and demonstrate its high potential in industrial applications, to be used as a reinforcement in polymer composite materials and to substitute carbon black, mineral fillers like talc, and short glass fibre. His research regarding biocarbon-based plastic biocomposites is utilized by Ford Motor Company, Volkswagen, General Motors, and Tesla, while conducting their trials of automotive parts.

Biocomposites
In his studies regarding bio-based plastics and bio-based fillers, Mohanty designed biocomposites to utilize closed-loop strategies to improve sustainability through the value-added integration of agri-food residues. While using “waste” from reclaimed coffee bean skins with more expensive compostable plastic blends, he developed numerous commercial resins, including the world's first 100% compostable coffee pod certified by the Biodegradable Products Institute (BPI). His invention combines the advantages of biodegradable plastics, green chemistry, reactive extrusion, and process engineering, along with the integration of the industrial ‘waste’ product of the coffee roasting industry. Mohanty along with Misra also developed a “green floor” formulation, based on a plant derived plastic resin, poly(lactic acid) (PLA). His innovation eliminated plasticizers containing harmful phthalates.

Awards/honors
1980 - Gold medal, Utkal University, Orissa being 1st Class 1st in M.Sc (Chemistry)
1998 - 1999 - Alexander von Humboldt Fellowship, AvH Foundation, Germany
2006 - Andrew Chase Forest Products Division Award, American Institute of Chemical Engineers, USA
2011 - 2015 - 5 Year Visiting Professorship, South China University of Technology, China
2011 - Jim Hammar Memorial Service Award, BioEnvironmental Polymer Society, USA 
2012 - "Gold Medal" and Certificate, International Conference on Composites Interfaces
2015 - Lifetime Achievement Award, BioEnvironmental Polymer Society, USA 
2016 - Innovation of the Year Award, University of Guelph, Canada 
2017 - Featured Canadian Author, Selected for ACS Publications Open Access Virtual Issue “Hot Materials in a Cool Country” - articles authored by Canadians to celebrate the 100th Canadian Chemistry Conference 
2017 - Highly Prolific Author, American Chemical Society (ACS) Sustainable Chemistry & Engineering, USA
2018 - NSERC Synergy Award for Innovation, Natural Sciences and Engineering Research Council, Canada
2019 - OAC Alumni Distinguished Researcher Award, University of Guelph, Canada 
2019 - Biju Patnaik Award for Scientific Excellence, Odisha Bigyan Academy, India
2008 - 2020 - Premier's Research Chair in Biomaterials & Transportation, University of Guelph, Canada
2017 - 2020 - Research Leadership Chair Award, University of Guelph, Canada 
2020 - JL White Innovation Award, International Polymer Processing Society 
2018 - Fellow, American Institute of Chemical Engineers (AIChE), USA
2019 - Fellow, Society of Plastics Engineers (SPE), USA 
2019 - Fellow, Royal Society of Chemistry (RSC), UK
2020 - OAC Distinguished Research Chair in Sustainable Biomaterials, University of Guelph, Canada
2020 - Fellow, Royal Society of Canada (RSC), Canada
2021 - Miroslaw Romanowski Medal, Royal Society of Canada, Canada

Personal life
Mohanty is married to Manjusri Misra.

Bibliography

Books
Natural Fibers, Biopolymers, and Biocomposites (2005) ISBN 9781135498979
Packaging Nanotechnology (2009) ISBN 9781588831057
Handbook of Polymernanocomposites. Processing, Performance and Application: Volume A: Layered Silicates (2014) ISBN 9783642386497
Biocomposites: Design and Mechanical Performance (2015) ISBN 9781782423942
Fiber Technology for Fiber-Reinforced Composites (2017) ISBN 9780081009932

Selected articles
Mohanty, A. K., Misra, M. A., & Hinrichsen, G. I. (2000). "Biofibres, biodegradable polymers and biocomposites: An overview". Macromolecular materials and Engineering, 276(1), 1-24.
Mohanty, A. K., Misra, M., & Drzal, L. T. (2002). "Sustainable bio-composites from renewable resources: Opportunities and challenges in the green materials world". Journal of Polymers and the Environment, 10(1), 19–26.
Wu, F., Misra, M., & Mohanty, A.K. (2021). "Challenges and new opportunities on barrier performance of biodegradable polymers for sustainable packaging". Progress in Polymer Science, 101395. 
Meereboer, K., Misra, M., & Mohanty, A.K. (2020). "Review of recent advances on biodegradability of polyhydroxyalkanoate (PHA) bioplastics and their green composites". Green Chemistry, 22(17), 5519-5558. 
Joshi, S. V., Drzal, L. T., Mohanty, A. K., & Arora, S. (2004). "Are natural fiber composites environmentally superior to glass fiber reinforced composites?". Composites Part A: Applied science and manufacturing, 35(3), 371–376.
Mohanty, A. K., Vivekanandhan, S., Pin, J. M., & Misra, M. (2018). "Composites from renewable and sustainable resources: Challenges and innovations". Science, 362(6414), 536–542.

References 

Living people
Year of birth missing (living people)
Utkal University alumni
Academic staff of the University of Guelph
Canadian materials scientists
Odisha academics
Canadian science writers
Fellows of the Royal Society of Canada